The Yoruba Football Federation (YFF), is the governing body of football in Yorubaland. The association was established in 2020. The current Chairman and General Secretary is S Salako and S. Enikanoniaye respectively. It supervises the Yoruba national football team.

References

Yoruba
CONIFA member associations
Football in Nigeria
Football in Africa not associated with FIFA